Saraca declinata, the red saraca or sorrowless tree, is a tree in genus Saraca belonging to the family Fabaceae.

The species is found both in Thailand and Burma, and has been introduced in Ceylon.

References

declinata
Trees of Myanmar
Trees of Thailand